Larry Carlton is a guitarist.

Lawrence or Larry Carlton may also refer to:

Larry Carlton (album)
Lawrence K. Karlton, American judge